Sambalpur railway division is one of the three railway divisions under East Coast Railway zone of Indian Railways. This railway division was formed on 5 November 1951 and its headquarter is located at Sambalpur in the state of Odisha of India.

Waltair railway division and Khurda Road railway division are the other two railway divisions under ECoR Zone headquartered at Bhubaneshwar.

List of railway stations and towns 
The list includes the stations under the Sambalpur railway division and their station category.

Stations closed for Passengers -

References

 
Divisions of Indian Railways
1951 establishments in Orissa

Transport in Sambalpur